Lister Laurance (1912–1977) was a British film editor. He edited over a dozen films from 1932 to 1950 and direct one film, the 1937 film Mr. Smith Carries On.

Selected filmography

Editor
 Frail Women (1932)
 In a Monastery Garden (1932)
 The Black Abbot (1934)
 Whispering Tongues (1934)
 The Admiral's Secret (1934)
 Music Hall (1934)
 Flood Tide (1934)
 D'Ye Ken John Peel? (1935)
 Night Ride (1937)
 Mr. Smith Carries On (1937)
 The Last Curtain (1937)
 Missing, Believed Married (1937)
 A Spot of Bother (1938)
 The Lambeth Walk (1939)
 The Glass Mountain (1949)
 The Girl Who Couldn't Quite (1950)
 Once a Sinner (1950)
 Lilli Marlene (1950)

Director
 Mr. Smith Carries On (1937)

References

Further reading
 Low, Rachael. Filmmaking in 1930s Britain. George Allen & Unwin, 1985.

External links

British film editors
Film directors from London
1912 births
1977 deaths
Film people from London